Chaca bankanensis is a species of angler catfish found in the Sundaland region, where it occurs in Brunei, Indonesia, Malaysia, and Thailand.  It is found in peat swamps and streams.  This species grows to a length of 20.0 cm (7.9 in).  It is found in the aquarium trade.

References 
 

Chacidae
Fish described in 1852
Fish of Malaysia
Fish of Indonesia
Fish of Thailand